EAC may refer to:

Education 
 Eastern Arizona College, in Thatcher, Arizona, United States
 Emilio Aguinaldo College, in Manila, Philippines

Government and politics 
 East African Community, a trade bloc
 East Asian Community, a proposed trade bloc
 Election Assistance Commission of the Government of the United States
 Electoral Affairs Commission of Hong Kong
 Electricity Authority of Cambodia
 Electricity Authority of Cyprus
 Environmental audit committee of the Parliament of the United Kingdom
 European Advisory Commission, a commission arranged at the 1943 Moscow Conference between the Allies of World War II
 European Asylum Curriculum, a European Union project in the field of asylum

Medicine 
 Ehrlich ascites carcinoma
 Erythema annulare centrifugum
 Esophageal adenocarcinoma
 External auditory canal

Military 
 Eastern Air Command (India)
 Echelon above corps
 RCAF Eastern Air Command, active during World War II

Sport
 European Archery Championships
 European Athletics Championships
 FAI European Aerobatic Championships

Technology 
 EAC-C2C, a submarine telecommunications cable system
 Enhanced Audio Codec
 Exact Audio Copy, a CD ripping software package
 Encoded Archival Context, an XML-based standard
 Extended Access Control, a security feature for e-passports
 Easy Anti-Cheat, a security program for online games

Other uses
 EA Canada, a video game developer
 East Asiatic Company, a Danish transport company
 East Australian Current
 Eastern Agricultural Complex, indigenous plants cultivated in the precontact southeastern United States
 Ecology Action Centre, a Canadian environmental organization
 Editors' Association of Canada, a professional organization
 Eko Atlantic, a planned city in Lagos State, Nigeria
 Energy Action Coalition, now Power Shift Network, a North American youth environmental organization
 Equivalent annual cost
 Euro-American Challenge, an American football game
 Euro-Atlantic Centre, a Slovak NGO in the field of foreign and security policies
 Europae Archaeologiae Consilium, an association of archaeological heritage authorities
 Eurasian Conformity mark, a certification mark valid in post-Soviet countries that belong to the Eurasian Customs Union
 European Air Charter, a defunct British airline
 European Arboricultural Council, an international forestry agency
 European Astronaut Centre, a training site of the European Space Agency in Cologne, Germany 
 European Astronaut Corps, a unit of the European Space Agency (from Russian Евразийское соответствие)
 Everyone's a Critic, a defunct film community website
 Estimate at completion, in earned value management
 Extend Air Cartridge, a make or type of already-filled one-use absorbent canister for use in a rebreather breathing set